Emanuele Felice Blandamura (born 19 December 1979) is an Italian professional boxer. He held the European Union middleweight title in 2014, the European middleweight title from 2016 to 2018, and has challenged once for a world title in 2018.

Professional career
Blandamura made his professional debut on 29 April 2007, scoring a second-round stoppage against Alex Herceg, who also debuted. On 16 June 2012, Blandamura won his first major regional championship—the vacant WBC Silver International middleweight title—by stopping Luca Tassi in ten rounds. This was followed up on 25 January 2014, when Blandamura defeated Marcos Nader via twelve-round split decision (SD) to win the European Union middleweight title.

On 26 July 2014, Blandamura suffered his first career loss to Billy Joe Saunders, who knocked him out in eight rounds to win the vacant European middleweight title. A second chance for Blandamura to win the title, which Saunders later vacated, came on 20 June 2015. This time, Blandamura was knocked out in the eighth round by Michel Soro. On 3 December 2016, Blandamura won the vacant European middleweight title on his third attempt, winning an SD over Matteo Signani.

Professional boxing record

References

External links

Italian male boxers
Middleweight boxers
1979 births
Sportspeople from Udine
Living people
European Boxing Union champions